Ulrich IV of Württemberg (born after 1315–1366, at Castle Hohenneuffen), Count of Württemberg. He reigned, together with his brother Eberhard II from 1344 until 1362.

During his reign he stood in the shadow of his brother Eberhard II. Because of that he temporarily strove towards the division of the realm. This is the reason why Eberhard II forced him to sign a treaty that stipulated the indivisibility of the county on 3 December 1361. Soon after that Ulrich relinquished his participation in the government of Württemberg on 1 May 1362.

Ulrich IV married countess Katharina von Helfenstein before 1350, producing no children.

This article is translated from that on the German Wikipedia

14th-century births
1366 deaths
14th-century counts of Württemberg